John Humphreys (15 March 1932 – 14 September 2017) was an Australian fencer. He competed at the 1960 and 1964 Summer Olympics.

References

1932 births
2017 deaths
Australian male fencers
Olympic fencers of Australia
Fencers at the 1960 Summer Olympics
Fencers at the 1964 Summer Olympics
Commonwealth Games medallists in fencing
Fencers at the 1966 British Empire and Commonwealth Games
Commonwealth Games silver medallists for Australia
Commonwealth Games bronze medallists for Australia
20th-century Australian people
Medallists at the 1962 British Empire and Commonwealth Games
Medallists at the 1966 British Empire and Commonwealth Games